Elsie Kelly (born 7 June 1936) is an English actress. She is best known for portraying the role of Noreen Maltby in the ITV hit sitcom Benidorm (2007–2012, 2015–2018).

Career
Kelly appeared in the popular television soap opera Crossroads in 1986 in a regular role as cleaner and gossip Mrs Tardebigge, a role which lasted until the series demise in 1988.

After a lengthy gap from television work she appeared in the film Intimate Relations in 1996 and then returned to television to play Joan, the cook in the 1995–1997 television adaptation of The Famous Five for a number of episodes. This was followed by the part of Mrs Humphries in The Ghost Hunter in 2000 and Florrie in Harry and the Wrinklies.

In 2006, Kelly joined the cast from the first series of the ITV comedy series Benidorm, playing the character of Noreen Maltby. In series 10, Kelly also played Noreen's identical twin sister Doreen in a dual role.

Kelly has also appeared as Mrs. Hargreaves in  Coronation Street for 2 episodes in 2011, and has appeared in an episode of Skins.

Kelly has been the permanent Director of Birkenhead Operatic Society Trust since 1973, having directed and overseen many productions in the Liverpool Empire, Liverpool Royal Court, the Floral Pavilion in New Brighton and the Gladstone Theatre Port Sunlight.

Productions include Annie, 42nd Street, Oliver, The Sound of Music, The Full Monty, Hello Dolly, Crazy for you, The Scarlet Pimpernel, and Jekyll and Hyde.

References

External links
 

Living people
1936 births
English television actresses